Ryan McGivern (born 8 January 1990) is a Northern Irish footballer who plays for NIFL Championship club Newry City. He can play as a left-back or a central defender, and has represented Northern Ireland in international football.

He began his career with Manchester City and won the FA Youth Cup with the club in 2008. He played on loan at Morecambe, Leicester City, Walsall, Crystal Palace, Bristol City and Hibernian. He spent the 2012–13 season on loan at Hibernian, playing on the losing side in the 2013 final of the Scottish Cup, before he joined the club permanently for a one-season stay in the Scottish Premiership. He joined Port Vale in June 2014, and made 55 appearances for the club across two seasons. He moved on to Shrewsbury Town in June 2016, and had his contract terminated by mutual consent 14 months later. He signed a short-term contract with Northampton Town in November 2017, before moving on to Swindon Town four months later. He returned to Northern Ireland in July 2018 to sign for Linfield. The club won the NIFL Premiership title in both of his first two seasons, though he made only limited appearances. He joined hometown club Newry City in June 2021 and helped them win the NIFL Championship title in the 2021–22 season and the Mid-Ulster Cup in 2023.

He won caps for Northern Ireland at under-16, under-17, under-19 and under-21 levels before he won his first senior cap in August 2008. He won a total of 24 caps in an eight-year international career. He has also played for the Northern Ireland B team.

Club career

Manchester City
Born in Newry, McGivern is a product of the Manchester City youth teams. He played in the club's 2008 FA Youth Cup final win over Chelsea. He scored in the 2007–08 Premier Academy League play-off semi-final win over Sunderland, before featuring in the side that lost to Aston Villa in the play-offs.

On 25 October 2008, McGivern joined Morecambe on loan; "Shrimps" manager Sammy McIlroy stated that "I have seen Ryan play a few times and been very impressed by what I've seen". Having already won international caps, he made his debut in the Football League on 25 October, featuring in a 2–1 defeat to Port Vale at Vale Park. He scored his first ever senior goal in a 2–0 victory over Aldershot Town at Christie Park on 1 November. In total he played five League Two games and made one appearance in the League Trophy. McGivern was promoted to Manchester City's first team squad for their Premier League game versus Fulham on 12 April 2009 and was an unused substitute.

On 29 August 2009, McGivern joined Championship side Leicester City on loan until January 2010. He made his debut for Nigel Pearson's "Foxes" in a 2–0 win over Crystal Palace at the King Power Stadium on 20 October. Despite scoring an own goal in a 1–1 draw with Ipswich Town on 10 January, the following day his loan was extended until the end of the 2009–10 season. He played a total of twelve league games for Leicester but was not selected for the Championship play-off semi-finals, which they lost to Cardiff City.

McGivern was loaned to Chris Hutchings's League One club Walsall on loan for the 2010–11 season, having beaten competition for his services from other clubs. He was a regular in the first team before losing his place after getting sent off for a "reckless two-footed challenge" during a 1–1 draw with Fleetwood Town in the FA Cup on 6 November. He made a total of 16 appearances for the "Saddlers" during his stay at the Bescot Stadium before he was recalled on 20 January 2011. City manager Roberto Mancini handed McGivern his first team debut at the City of Manchester Stadium in a Premier League game against Sunderland on 3 April 2011, using him as a 70th-minute substitute to replace Dedryck Boyata in a game that City won 5–0.

After signing a new deal, keeping him at City until 2013, McGivern made a 28-day loan move to Crystal Palace on 3 August 2011. He provided an assist for Jonathan Parr on his home debut for Dougie Freedman's "Eagles" at Selhurst Park, in a 2–0 victory over Burnley on 13 August. After his loan spell at Palace ended, McGivern moved to Bristol City for the remainder of the 2011–12 season. He made his debut for Derek McInnes's "Robins" on 10 September, in a 1–0 defeat to Brighton & Hove Albion at Ashton Gate Stadium. He made a total of 32 appearances for Bristol City, helping the club to finish above the Championship relegation zone.

Hibernian
In August 2012, McGivern signed on loan for Pat Fenlon's Scottish Premier League side Hibernian until January 2013. Having been an unused substitute for two games, he finally made his debut, coming on for Alan Maybury, in a 2–1 loss against Aberdeen at Pittodrie Stadium. He then established himself at "Hibs", playing in the left-back position, replacing Maybury, who would play in the right-back position. His playing time having been increased, his loan deal was extended until the end of the 2012–13 season. After having his loan extended, McGivern said he would decide his future beyond then at the end of the season. During a match against Dundee United on 24 February 2013, McGivern was penalized for a foul on Gary Mackay-Steven which resulted in a penalty kick for United even though television coverage showed the incident was clearly outside the penalty area. After the match, McGivern criticised referee Alan Muir and his assistant Graham McNeillie for their decision. McGivern scored his first goal for Hibernian three days later, a 2–2 draw with Kilmarnock at Easter Road.

McGivern agreed a two-year contract with Hibernian after his contract with Manchester City came to an end. He made 38 appearances in the 2013–14 campaign, as the club suffered relegation into the Championship under the stewardship of Terry Butcher.

Port Vale
McGivern signed a two-year contract with League One side Port Vale in June 2014 after newly appointed Hibernian boss Alan Stubbs agreed to release him from the remaining 12 months of his contract. He started the 2014–15 season in a centre-back partnership with Richard Duffy. He remained a regular first team player until he fractured his arm in a 2–0 defeat to Coventry City at Vale Park on 13 December; the injury required a plate to be fitted in his arm and a six-week recovery period.

He was out of the first team picture in the first two months of the 2015–16 season, before he returned to the starting eleven due to injuries to Ryan Inniss and Remie Streete. He was released upon the expiry of his contract at the end of the season.

Shrewsbury Town
McGivern signed with League One side Shrewsbury Town in June 2016, along with former Port Vale teammates A-Jay Leitch-Smith and Louis Dodds. He made his debut for the club on the opening day of the season, in a 0−1 home defeat against Milton Keynes. Featuring regularly for the club in the early part of the season saw McGivern recalled to the Northern Ireland squad for the first time in nearly two years, however subsequent call-ups limited his first-team opportunities at Shrewsbury during a period which also saw manager Micky Mellon leave the club. He was recalled to the side by new manager Paul Hurst as Shrewsbury kept back-to-back clean sheets in 0−0 draws against former club Port Vale and Fleetwood Town, but a shoulder injury picked up in the next match, a 1−0 victory away at Millwall in December, kept him out of contention for a minimum of three weeks. He was not allocated a squad number ahead of the following season, having been told he was not in the club's future plans. On 31 August 2017, McGivern had his contract terminated by mutual consent.

Northampton Town
On 3 November 2017, McGivern signed a two-month contract with League One side Northampton Town. Manager Jimmy Floyd Hasselbaink said that "with Regan Poole playing a lot of his football in midfield recently and with Leon Barnett recovering from injury, while Ash Taylor and Aaron Pierre have done very well, they have had to play a lot of football recently and haven't had the benefit of competition for their places. Ryan coming in provides that and, with him having been on the training ground with us for a while, we have had the chance to have a look at him and he has already fitted in well with the group." He was released by the "Cobblers" upon the expiry of his contract on 3 January 2018.

Swindon Town
On 15 March 2018, following an increasing amount of injuries at the County Ground, McGivern joined Swindon Town on a deal until the end of the 2017–18 League Two campaign. He was Phil Brown's first signing as manager of the "Robins". He was offered a new contract by Swindon at the end of the season, but never signed it and instead left the club on 28 June after Brown confirmed that the offer had been withdrawn.

Linfield
On 23 July 2018, following his release from Swindon, McGivern returned to Northern Ireland to join NIFL Premiership side Linfield on a three-year deal. "Blues" manager David Healy said that he believed McGivern would "make a major contribution to the club". However injury problems meant that he featured only five times during the 2018–19 title winning season after making his debut in a 1–0 victory over Ballymena United on 23 February. He was an unused substitute in the final of the Northern Ireland Football League Cup, where Linfield beat Ballymena United. He made 12 appearances during the 2019–20 season, before self-isolating after testing positive for Coronavirus disease 2019 on 10 March. Linfield were crowned league champions on points per game after the season was ended early due to the COVID-19 pandemic in Northern Ireland. He featured just four times in the 2020–21 campaign, scoring one goal in a 5–1 win over Carrick Rangers at Windsor Park.

Newry City
On 8 June 2021, he signed a two-year contract with NIFL Championship club Newry City, his hometown club. He was sent off during a 2–0 win at Ards in November. He made 21 league appearances in the 2021–22 campaign as Newry won the Championship title and secured promotion into the NIFL Premiership. On 7 February 2023, he played in the Mid-Ulster Cup final as Newry beat Dungannon Swifts 2–0.

International career
McGivern was a regular at various under-age levels for Northern Ireland, winning caps at under-17 level in 2006, before elevation to the under-19 set-up in 2007. He played in the Northern Ireland elite side during their 2008 Milk Cup win.

Steve Beaglehole called McGivern to the Northern Ireland Under-21 squad for a mini-tournament in Ukraine on 19 and 20 August 2008, but he did not make his under-21 debut as Nigel Worthington instead promoted McGivern into the full Northern Ireland squad as a replacement for the injured George McCartney for a friendly international against Scotland on 20 August. Aged 18, he made his debut in that match as a starter but was sent-off for two bookable offences by referee Nicolai Vollquartz. On 11 October 2008, he made his competitive debut for Northern Ireland, coming on as a second-half substitute in a 2010 FIFA World Cup qualifying match against Slovenia; the match ended in a 2–0 defeat. He continued to make occasional appearances for the national team, featuring in three further 2010 World Cup qualifying games, though he played in just one Euro 2012 qualifying game and two 2014 World Cup qualification matches. He did not feature for Northern Ireland in their Euro 2016 campaign, but was recalled to the squad in September 2016 for their first 2018 World Cup qualifying match against the Czech Republic. McGivern made his first international appearance since 2014, as a half-time substitute in a 3–0 defeat to Croatia, on 15 November 2016.

Career statistics

Club statistics

International statistics

Honours
Northern Ireland
Milk Cup: 2008

Manchester City
FA Youth Cup: 2008

Hibernian
Scottish Cup runner-up: 2013

Linfield
NIFL Premiership: 2018–19, 2019–20, 2020–21
Irish League Cup: 2018–19

Newry City
NIFL Championship: 2021–22 
Mid-Ulster Cup: 2023

References

1990 births
Living people
Sportspeople from Newry
Association footballers from Northern Ireland
Northern Ireland youth international footballers
Northern Ireland under-21 international footballers
Northern Ireland international footballers
Northern Ireland B international footballers
Association football defenders
Manchester City F.C. players
Morecambe F.C. players
Leicester City F.C. players
Walsall F.C. players
Crystal Palace F.C. players
Bristol City F.C. players
Hibernian F.C. players
Port Vale F.C. players
Shrewsbury Town F.C. players
Northampton Town F.C. players
Swindon Town F.C. players
Linfield F.C. players
Newry City A.F.C. players
English Football League players
Premier League players
Scottish Premier League players
Scottish Professional Football League players
NIFL Premiership players
NIFL Championship players